Tim Firkins (born January 18, 1948) is an American politician who served as the representative for the 38th district in the Kentucky House of Representatives from January 2007 to January 2011. Firkins was elected in November 2006 and ran unopposed in November 2008. He lost re-election in the Republican wave election of 2010.

References

1948 births
Living people
Democratic Party members of the Kentucky House of Representatives
Politicians from Louisville, Kentucky